KVHF-LD, virtual channel 4 (VHF digital channel 5), is a low-powered VBC Guide-affiliated television station licensed to Fresno, California, United States. The station is owned by Ventura Broadcasting.

KVHF-LD used to broadcast interactive music video programming from NOYZ. KVHF-LD has been affiliated with Jewelry Television.

Subchannels
The station's digital signal is multiplexed:

References

External links

www.venturabroadcasting.com

VHF-LD
Mass media in Fresno, California
Low-power television stations in the United States